Spin.FX is a Central Australian Indigenous band from the community of Papunya, Northern Territory. They sing in Luritja and play a mixture of reggae, rock, country and traditional sounds. The band's name is a modified spelling of spinifex.

Members
Stanley Roberts -  vocals, guitar
Derek Williams - vocals, rhythm guitar
Amos Egan - vocals, lead guitar
Jason Butcher - drums
Esau Marshall - bass guitar, keyboards
Abraham Phillipus - bass
Leslie Pearce - backing vocals
Malcom Karpa - backing vocals
Lance McDonald

Discography
Ulumburruâ (2000) - CAAMA
Uluparru (2002) - CAAMA
Warumpinya (2006) - CAAMA

References
Deadly Vibe Issue 72 February 2003 Spin FX
Music Australia Uluparru
Music Australia Warumpinya

Northern Territory musical groups
Indigenous Australian musical groups